Devil's Triangle, or the Bermuda Triangle, is a region in the North Atlantic Ocean.

Devil's Triangle may also refer to:

Arts and entertainment

Television
 "Devil's Triangle" (NCIS), an episode of the series NCIS
 "Devil's Triangle", an episode of the series MysteryQuest
 "The Devil's Triangle", an episode of the series Curiosity

Music
 "The Devil's Triangle", a song by King Crimson on the album In the Wake of Poseidon
 "The Devil's Triangle", a song by Dagoba on the album Poseidon
 "Devil's Triangle", a song by Primitive Radio Gods on the album White Hot Peach

Other entertainment
 The Devil's Triangle, a book by J.T. Ellison and Catherine Coulter
 "The Devil's Triangle", a short story by Melinda M. Snodgrass in the book One-Eyed Jacks
 Hidden Expedition: Devil's Triangle, a video game

Other uses
 Angel's Triangle, El Paso, Texas, US, a neighborhood previously named Devil's Triangle

See also
 Devil's Sea